Gil Gunthorpe (9 August 1910 – 3 June 1998) was an Australian cricketer. He played in two first-class matches for Queensland between 1935 and 1937.

See also
 List of Queensland first-class cricketers

References

External links
 

1910 births
1998 deaths
Australian cricketers
Queensland cricketers
Cricketers from Queensland